Gulf Craft is a manufacturer of luxury yachts and fiberglass boats based in Umm Al Quwain in the United Arab Emirates. Gulf Craft operates from two shipyards in the UAE and one in the Maldives.

History
Gulf Craft was founded in 1982 in the United Arab Emirates by the Alshaali brothers- Mohammed, Abdullah and Jamal and their friend Dr. Mohammed Hamdan. Mohammed Hussain Alshaali currently serves as the Chairman of the company. It started as a manufacturer in the small open boat category.

In 1992, Gulf Craft expanded its product range into larger fly-bridge designs using inboard diesel installations.

With a growing range of boats and yachts approaching 100' in length the new millennium saw Gulf Craft sell to Europe and many of it Majesty Yachts fleet are present in the marinas of France, Spain and Italy.

In March 2017, Gulf Craft announced that they are planning an IPO on the Dubai financial market by the end of the year. The company also announced its intention to build more superyachts (or megayachts), following the growing trend of superyacht hubs in the Mediterranean sea.

Manufacturing facilities
Gulf Craft operates four manufacturing facilities – two facilities in Ajman, UAE, which also includes a service centre, a 100,000 square foot facility in the Maldives and a 462,000 square foot facility in Umm Al Quwain, UAE, equipped with a 150-ton and a 500-ton travel lift and two launching bays. The company currently employs close to 1,600 people across its three facilities. The company uses advanced manufacturing technologies such as sandwich construction, vacuum infusion processes, and water-jet drives engineered on large yachts.

In 2015, Gulf Craft produced 400 boats, 40–50 of them being yachts.

Brands
In 2016, Gulf Craft announced its megayachts projects- Majesty 200 and Majesty 175 at the Monaco Yacht Show. Gulf Craft launched at the 2017 Dubai International Boat Show, its first sky-lounge superyacht, the Majesty 100.
Oryx Sport Yachts & Cruisers: In 2006, Gulf Craft introduced the Oryx line of sport yachts and cruisers. Starting from the Oryx 27 sport cruiser, the range extends to larger size sport cruisers such as the Oryx 36 and Oryx 42 as well as the Oryx 43 Fly.
Silvercraft: Series officially launched in 2008 to represent the wide and diverse range of smaller fishing boats and family cruisers manufactured by Gulf Craft. Silvercraft offers a family of center console fishing boats and multifunctional walkaround cruisers for sport fishing enthusiasts. Gulf Craft launched 2 new models under the Silvercraft series at the 2017 Dubai International Boat Show- the Silvercraft 48 HT & Silvercraft 31 HT Cabin.
Nomad Yachts: Brand of explorer-type yachts under Gulf Craft that offer long-range, fuel efficiency. The range consists of Nomad 55, Nomad 65, Nomad 75 and Nomad 95.
Utility Series: Passenger and multipurpose transportation vessels which include the Touring 31, Touring 36, Touring 38, Touring 40, Touring 43, Touring 45 and Waveshuttle 56.

Awards and accolades
1992 – Awarded International Gold Star Award for Quality from Gulf News, Gulf Enterprises in Madrid, Spain
2004 – Silvercraft awarded "Best Exhibitor" at the India International Boat Show in Kerala, India
2006 – Receives the Ajman Excellence Award in the Largest National Factory Category
2008 – Won "Best Boating and Yachting Video" at the 2nd International Maritime Awards by Marine Biz TV
2009 – Won "Best Asian Motor Boat Builder for 31–50 feet" at Asia Boating Awards in Shanghai
2009 – Gulf Craft Service Centre Maldives awarded by the Maldives Police Service for excellent service rendered
2009 – Gulf Craft Service Centre Maldives awarded by the Maldives National Defense Force for excellent service rendered
2010 – Gulf Craft awarded with "Innovation and Excellence Award" and Gulf Craft Chairman receives "Life Achievement Award" at World of Yachts Recognition Awards
2012 – Won China Yachting Award for Luxury Vessels over 80 feet (24 m)
2013 – Won "Best Asia Built Yacht" at Asia Boating Awards for the Majesty 135
2013 – Won "Best New Building Yard" at the 6th Marine Biz TV international Maritime Awards
2013 – Won 'Best Local Boat Builder 2013' by Boat Owner Middle East
2014 – Won "Best Asian Yacht Builder of 15-24m" at the Asia Boating Awards
2014 – Won "Best Production Fiber Vessel 5 m-24 m" during the Marine Expo in Maldives
2015 – Won "Best Asian Built Yacht" for the Majesty 122 in Hong Kong during the Asian Boating Awards
2016 – Won "Best Asian Motor Yacht Builder" at the Asian Boating Awards
2016 – Won "Quality & Value Award" for the Majesty 122 at the World Superyacht Awards

After-sales services
Gulf Craft provides after-sales services including exterior, interior, mechanical, electrical, air conditioning and fabrication works.  They have a 75 tonne travel lift at the Ajman Service Centre and are able to lift up to 500 tonnes at the Umm Al Quwain shipyard.

References

Yacht building companies
Manufacturing companies established in 1982
1982 establishments in the United Arab Emirates
Shipbuilding companies of the United Arab Emirates
Emirati companies established in 1982